Monarchy of Nigeria may refer to:
Nigerian traditional rulers
Monarchy of Nigeria (1960–1963)

Nigerian royalty